A non-binding referendum on the Single European Act was held in Denmark on 27 February 1986. It was approved by 56.2% of voters, with a voter participation of 75.4%.

The referendum was held by the government of the Prime Minister of Denmark, Poul Schlüter. The government was in favour of Denmark ratifying the Single European Act, but a majority in parliament was against it. The referendum was the last Europe-related referendum in which parties such as the Social Democrats and the Social Liberal Party recommended against ratification.

Results

References

History of the European Union
Referendums in Denmark
Denmark
1986 in Denmark
1986 in international relations
1986 in the European Economic Community
Denmark and the European Union
Referendums related to the European Union
February 1986 events in Europe